Amleto Novelli (18 October 1885 – 16 April 1924) was an Italian film actor of the silent era. He appeared in 110 films between 1909 and 1924.

Selected filmography
 Brutus (1911)
 Agrippina (1911)
 Quo Vadis (1913)
 Antony and Cleopatra (1913)
 Julius Caesar (1914)
 The Wedding March (1915)
 Avatar (1916)
 Malombra (1917)
 Ivan the Terrible (1917)
 Fabiola (1918)
 The Crusaders (1918)
 The Railway Owner (1919)
 The Shadow (1920)
 Zingari (1920)
 The Prey (1921)
Red Love (1921)
 The House of Pulcini (1924)
 Marco Visconti (1925)

References

External links

 

1885 births
1924 deaths
Italian male film actors
Italian male silent film actors
Actors from Bologna
20th-century Italian male actors